The 1988 European Karate Championships, the 23rd edition, was held in Genoa, Italy from May 3 to 5, 1988.

Medallists

Men's Competition

Individual

Team

Women's competition

Individual

Team

References

External links
 Karate Records - European Championship 1988

1988
International sports competitions hosted by Italy
European Karate Championship
European championships in 1988
Sports competitions in Genoa
Karate competitions in Italy
May 1988 sports events in Europe
20th century in Genoa